is a railway station located in the town of Happō, Akita Prefecture, Japan, operated by East Japan Railway Company (JR East).

Lines
Takinoma Station is served by the  Gonō Line, and is located 24.5 kilometers from the southern terminus of the line at Higashi-Noshiro Station.

Station layout
The station has one side platform serving a single bidirectional track. The unattended station is managed from Fukaura Station.

History
Takinoma Station was opened on April 20, 1963. With the privatization of the JNR on April 1, 1987, the station has been managed by JR East.

Surrounding area

See also
List of railway stations in Japan

References

External links

 JR East station information page 

Railway stations in Japan opened in 1963
Railway stations in Akita Prefecture
Gonō Line
Railway stations in Japan opened in 1953
Happō, Akita